Ernest Eugene Debs (February 7, 1904 – March 17, 2002) was a California State Assembly member from 1942 to 1947, a Los Angeles city councilman from 1947 to 1958 and a member of the Los Angeles County Board of Supervisors  from 1958 to 1974.

Biography
Debs was born in Toledo, Ohio, on February 7, 1904, and came to California in a box car when he was 20 to work in the motion picture industry as a dancer. He was also a salesman. "He had no college education and prided himself on being a self-made man," the Los Angeles Times reported in his obituary. Debs married Lorene Marsh Robertson of Placerville, California, in 1944; they had two adopted children, David and Catherine Clare. They lived at 2416 McCready Avenue in the Silver Lake district.

He was not related to Eugene V. Debs, the labor leader and Socialist candidate for president. He said in 1947:

We're not even remotely related. I am often asked the question, however, and generally it brings up the subject of my party affiliations and general philosophy of government. Well, I guess I'd be called a conservative Democrat. I was elected to the Assembly on both the Republican and Democratic tickets. Definitely I'm against radicals and Communists. At the same time I think the little fellow should get a square deal—I'm for that, too.

Debs, a resident of Indian Wells, Riverside County, at the time,  died at the age of 98 on March 17, 2002. He was survived by his wife, Betty Debs; and children David Debs, Candi Debs, Stan Grant, Lonnie Gordon and Nancy Martel. A memorial service was held in the Los Angeles County Hall of Administration.

Public service

Congress
Debs ran unsuccessfully for the Congressional seat in the 17th District in 1932. Nineteen years later, in the context of a heated City Council reelection campaign, he was accused by Walter C. Smith, an executive with Lockheed Aircraft, of having registered as a Socialist in both 1930 and 1931  and to have favored "government ownership of public utilities" during the 1932 campaign.

State Assembly

Debs gave up show business to become a sergeant-at-arms in the State Assembly, and in 1942 he won election to the Assembly in the 56th District. While in the State Assembly, he authored the bill establishing the California State University at Los Angeles campus.

City Council

Elections
See List of Los Angeles municipal election returns, 1931 and after.

Debs first ran for the Los Angeles City Council District 8 seat in the "extreme southwest" of the city in 1931, but came in fourth in a field of eight candidates: Incumbent Evan Lewis was the winner. At that time, according to Walter C. Smith, he was registered in the Liberty Party. In 1947 he ran for the District 13 seat in an area that extended westward to Vermont Avenue and south to Valley Boulevard; he beat incumbent John R. Roden in the runoff vote. He had no opponent in 1949, and he won reelection in the 1951 and 1953 primaries. He had no opponent in 1957.

Positions
Incinerator, 1947. After an explosion at the controversial city incinerator at Avenue 21 and Lacy Street, Debs pushed through a resolution calling for an investigation into the circumstances of letting the contract.

Psychiatrist, 1949. Debs was in the forefront of a City Council move against J. Paul de River, the only Los Angeles Police Department psychiatrist at the  time, whose activities during the Black Dahlia murder case were said to have resulted in the arrest of two men later released for lack of evidence.<ref>[https://search.proquest.com/docview/165914511 "Police Force's Psychiatrist to Be Investigated," ''Los Angeles Times, March 9, 1949, page 4]</ref> He criticized de River for having written a "luridly illustrated" book on criminal sex cases, using Police Department files as source material. "The book is filthy and shocking," said Debs, "an obvious attempt to pander to depraved tastes."Heaters, 1957.''' He called for the investigation of what he said were 3,000 to 4,000 unvented gas heaters installed in the city schools.

Board of Supervisors

Debs was elected to the county Board of Supervisors in 1958, representing the 3rd District. As County Supervisor, he chaired 13 major departments, and served on many committees.

During the counterculture era of the 1960s, centered on the county-administered Sunset Strip, Debs was an implacable foe of the youth movements of the time and had several rock-and-roll venues, such as Pandora's Box, and coffeehouses shut down. Debs ordered the Sheriff's office to crack down on the counterculture-oriented nightlife, which led to the 1966 Sunset Strip riot. Debs ardently backed the construction of the Laurel Canyon Freeway and Beverly Hills Freeway and sought to turn the Sunset Strip into a new office district. With the cancellation of both freeway projects and competition from the nearby and newly built Century City as a premium office market,  Debs' plans for the Strip were only partly realized.

He appointed the final three members to the nine-member Los Angeles County Civil Defense and Disaster Commission during the nuclear crisis in the early 1960s: They were Disaster Services co-coordinator Roy D. Hoover, Sheriff Peter J. Pitchess, and  businessman Louis Lesser.

Legacy
Two public parks bear the Debs name:
 Ernest E. Debs Regional Park — in the western San Rafael Hills above the Arroyo Seco, in the Montecito Heights neighborhood of central-northeast Los Angeles.
 Ernest Debs Park — in Bell (southeastern L.A. County).

References

External links
 Ernest E. Debs, oral history interview, conducted 1987 by Carlos Vásquez, UCLA Oral History Program, for the California State Archives State Government Oral History Program
 Join California Ernest E. Debs

Democratic Party members of the California State Assembly
Los Angeles City Council members
Los Angeles County Board of Supervisors
1904 births
2002 deaths
20th-century American politicians
People from Indian Wells, California
New Right (United States)